Ghadi Chowk Raipur also known as 
"Guru Ghasidas Time Square" is a clock tower located in the heart of Raipur city of Chhattisgarh, India. Constructed in 1995 and the structure was inaugurated on 19 December 1995. This place is considered an important landmark in Raipur and has become iconic symbol of Raipur. A six-foot diameter mechanical clock was installed around its pillar, about 50 feet high, made of concrete. After every hour in the clock, the bell in its turret used to ring. To popularize the folk tunes of Chhattisgarh. Raipur Development Authority decided to combine the folk tunes of Chhattisgarh before the sound of the bell ringing after every hour in Nagarghari so that the common man can also become familiar with the folk tunes of Chhattisgarh.

References

Clock towers in India
Buildings and structures in Raipur, Chhattisgarh